John Frederick Lampe (born Johann Friedrich Lampe; probably 1703 – 25 July 1751) was a musician and composer.

Life

Lampe was born in Saxony, Germany but came to England in 1724 and played the bassoon in opera houses. In 1730, he was hired by John Rich to be the composer for Covent Garden Theatre. During his time as a bassoonist in London opera houses, in 1727, he played at the coronation of King George II.

Like Arne, Lampe wrote operatic works in English in defiance of the vogue for Italian opera popularized by George Frideric Handel and Nicola Porpora.  Lampe, along with Henry Carey and J. S. Smith, founded the short-lived English Opera Project.  He became a friend of Charles Wesley, and wrote several tunes to accompany Wesley's hymns.  His works for the stage include the mock operas Pyramus and Thisbe (1745) and The Dragon of Wantley (1734), which ran for 69 nights, a record for the time, surpassing The Beggar's Opera.

From November, 1750 until his death, Lampe was based in Dublin and later in Edinburgh. He is buried in Canongate Kirkyard on the Royal Mile. The grave lies to the northeast of the church behind the Fettes vault.

Works
The Cuckoo Concerto
Cupid and Psyche or the Columbine Courtezan
The Dragon of Wantley
Hymns on the Great Festivals and other Occasions
The Perfections of True Love
Pyramus and Thisbe

Family

His wife, Isabella Lampe, was sister-in-law to the composer Thomas Arne with whom Lampe collaborated on a number of concert seasons. John and Isabella's son, Charles John Frederick Lampe, was a successful organist and composer as well.

References

External links
 

1703 births
1751 deaths
Burials at the Canongate Kirkyard
German emigrants to the Kingdom of Great Britain
Young musical family (England)
18th-century German people
People from the Kingdom of Saxony
English classical composers
German Baroque composers
German opera composers
Male opera composers
German emigrants to England
English classical bassoonists
German classical bassoonists
18th-century classical composers
German male classical composers
German emigrants to Scotland
18th-century German composers
18th-century German male musicians